Bror Östman (10 October 1928 – 23 April 1992) was a Swedish ski jumper who competed in the 1950s. Born in Själevad, he won the ski jumping bronze medal at the 1954 FIS Nordic World Ski Championships in Falun.

At the 1952 Winter Olympics he finished 32nd in the only ski jumping event.

Four years later he finished 14th in the ski jumping event at the 1956 Winter Olympics.

External links

1928 births
1992 deaths
People from Örnsköldsvik Municipality
Swedish male ski jumpers
Olympic ski jumpers of Sweden
Ski jumpers at the 1952 Winter Olympics
Ski jumpers at the 1956 Winter Olympics
FIS Nordic World Ski Championships medalists in ski jumping
Sportspeople from Västernorrland County